Patricio Gerardo Quiroz Kong (born 24 January 1980) is a Chilean former professional football midfielder who played for clubs in Chile, Austria, and Germany.

Career
As a youth player, Quiroz was with the Colo-Colo youth ranks for two years before joining Deportes Iquique youth system, taking part of the first team in 1998 thanks to the coach Jorge Garcés. In 2002, he switched to Coquimbo Unido in the top division with José Sulantay as coach, with whom he developed a close friendship. In his homeland, he also had a stint with Trasandino in 2009.

He spent most of his career in minor categories of Austrian football, where he came thanks to his fellow in Coquimbo Unido, Claudio Chavarría, who had played for Borussia Dortmund II. He also had a stint with German side FC Hammerau.

References

External links
 
 Patricio Quiroz at OEFB.at 

1980 births
Living people
People from Tocopilla
Chilean footballers
Chilean expatriate footballers
Chilean Primera División players
Primera B de Chile players
Deportes Iquique footballers
Coquimbo Unido footballers
Austrian Landesliga players
Tercera División de Chile players
Trasandino footballers
Chilean expatriate sportspeople in Austria
Chilean expatriate sportspeople in Germany
Expatriate footballers in Austria
Expatriate footballers in Germany
Association football midfielders